Mathilde Grooss Viddal (born 6 May 1969) is a Norwegian musician (saxophone and clarinet) and composer, known as the leader of Friensemblet and as member of bands like Lucky Loop and Eick/Viddal Duo.

Career 
Viddal was born in Oslo. She released albums Undergroove (2012) with her band Friensemblet, including live takes at Victoria, the Norwegian Nasjonal Jazzscene in Oslo, where she presents her more or less uklassifiserbare compositions, representing free spirited contemporary music full of improvisation and freewheeling elements. The collaboration was formed in 2004 by the name Chateau Neuf Friensemble, with a history from the 1960s University Big Band and the musical environment surrounding the Department of Musicology at University of Oslo. She also runs her own record label Giraffa Records. With Trude Eick she cooperates in the Eick/Viddal Duo and released the album November Log (2008).

Discography 
Friensemblet/Chateau Neuf Fri Ensemble
2006: Holding Balance (Giraffa Records)
2009: ComeCloser (Giraffa Records)
2012: Undergroove (Giraffa Records)

Eick/Viddal Duo
2008: November Log (Giraffa Records)

References

External links 

Friensemblet on MySpace
 

Norwegian classical clarinetists
Norwegian jazz saxophonists
Norwegian jazz clarinetists
Norwegian jazz composers
Musicians from Oslo
1969 births
Living people
21st-century saxophonists
21st-century clarinetists
Grappa Music artists
Women jazz saxophonists